was the Tokugawa shogunate's officially sanctioned gold monopoly or gold guild (za) which was created in 1595.
Initially, the Tokugawa shogunate was interested in assuring a consistent value in minted gold coins; and this led to the perceived need for attending to the supply of gold.

This bakufu title identifies a regulatory agency with responsibility for supervising the minting of gold coins and for superintending all gold mines, gold mining and gold-extraction activities in Japan.

See also
 Bugyō
 Kinzan-bugyō
 Ginza – Silver za (monopoly office or guild).
 Dōza – Copper za (monopoly office or guild).
 Shuza – Cinnabar za (monopoly office or guild)

Notes

References
 Hall, John W. (1955). Tanuma Okitsugu, 1719–1788: Forerunner of Modern Japan.  Cambridge: Harvard University Press.  OCLC 445621
 Jansen, Marius B. (1995). Warrior Rule in Japan. Cambridge: Cambridge University Press. ;  OCLC 422791897
 Schaede, Ulrike. (2000). Cooperative Capitalism: Self-Regulation, Trade Associations, and the Antimonopoly Law in Japan.  Oxford: Oxford University Press. ;  OCLC 505758165

Government of feudal Japan
Officials of the Tokugawa shogunate
Gold standard
Economy of feudal Japan
Guilds in Japan
Metals monopolies
1595 establishments in Japan